From March 9 to June 1, 1948, voters of the Democratic Party chose its nominee for president in the 1948 United States presidential election. Incumbent President Harry S. Truman was selected as the nominee through a series of primary elections and caucuses culminating in the 1948 Democratic National Convention held from July 12 to July 14, 1948, in Philadelphia, Pennsylvania. As a sitting President, his nomination was secured.

Delegates per state

Contests

See also
Republican Party presidential primaries, 1948

References